Cex is an American musical project run by Rjyan Claybrook Kidwell and started in 1998 at the age of 16. Although Cex and Kidwell are frequently used interchangeably, Cex occasionally expands to several people at sporadic points, such as particular tours or albums. In the past it has included Kidwell's musical associates, friends, touring partners, or high school bandmates.

History
The first Cex album, Cells, was a compilation of tracks Kidwell had been working on for several years, and was released in 1998 by his own CD-R label, _underscore, while he was still at Dulaney High School in Timonium, Maryland. The following year, Kidwell met Miguel Depedro (Kid 606) and the two founded Tigerbeat6, a record label which would be among the vanguards of the electronica movement at the time. The next Cex album, Role Model, was one of the label's first releases (2000), and was quickly followed up the next year with Oops, I Did It Again!. Oops not only took its title from the Britney Spears album of the same name, but played around with the title by depicting photos of the aftermath of a murder on the cover art.

All of the Cex releases up to this time were classified as IDM (Intelligent dance music) and had very little vocals or lyrics for the most part. However, Kidwell was not content to stay behind the laptop while on tour, and quickly and openly aspired to become "#1 Entertainer". He started to hone freestyling skills and performing new songs with vocal tracks like "who's the man with no clothes, underwear, fur coat, chilling in the alley?/I'm the man with no clothes, underwear, fur coat/he's brandishing knives!" ("Fur Coat") and "I know you're stressed/'cause there's only one Cex/and your girlfriend's pissed/'cause you ain't him" ("One Cex"). His vocal style was very confrontational and nearly atonal, and contained typically outrageous braggadocio; he frequently would go out of his way to chat to his audience between or in the middle of songs, and was known to strip down to his underwear (or less) from time to time. In 2002, he was offered a coveted tour spot opening for the East Coast leg of the Death and Dismemberment tour with Death Cab for Cutie and old friends from Washington, DC The Dismemberment Plan. Also in 2002 he collaborated with Aaron Funk; a Winnipeg electronic artist known as Venetian Snares to create "stamina" the ninth track on Aaron's '02 album "237 0894". Later that year, Tall, Dark, and Handcuffed, his first album with full vocals, was released. He continued to open for noted bands such as Super Furry Animals and The Roots, as well as musical friends Grand Buffet.

2003 was a pivotal year for Kidwell - after spending his entire life living in or around Baltimore, he packed up and drove out to Oakland, California. Car malfunctions and a week stranded in the western US became the inspiration for his second album of that year, Maryland Mansions. In April, he gained further exposure opening for indie darlings The Postal Service. Before this, however, he released Being Ridden in both vocal and instrumental form. The album cover paid homage to David Bowie, imitating the cover for "Heroes". Also notably, the album was not released by Tigerbeat6, and it seemed to have largely abandoned both the IDM and jokey old-school hip-hop of Tall, Dark, and Handcuffed for rawer sounds and themes. Maryland Mansions pushed those motifs further and was modelled somewhat on the Nine Inch Nails EP Broken, and was released just around the time that Kidwell returned to Baltimore. Two music videos for Maryland Mansions were released early in 2004, and Kidwell moved again, to Chicago a few months later.

Shortly thereafter, he married Roby Newton (from the band Milemarker), and reorganized Cex as a three-piece: Kidwell, Newton, and Cale Parks (from the bands Joan of Arc and Aloha). This configuration released an EP, Know Doubt, in 2005 on a Chicago label called Record Label. This trio, joined by Portland, OR duo Nice Nice and ex-Dismemberment Plan guitarist Jason Caddell, was featured on the next Cex album, 2006's Actual Fucking, made up of tracks named after and written about various American cities (Baltimore, Los Angeles, Denton, etc.). The album is heavy on vocals and was released by Seattle label Automation Records.

In 2007 Kidwell would go on to release an EP entitled Exotical Privates, which involved two different cover images for both CD and an LP.  The LP cover was in response to AFI's newly formed electronic project, Blaqk Audio, whose album was named the same as Kidwell's first record, CexCells.  The cover features an AFI tattoo on a scrotum.  The EP's musical material is made up of a combination of samples from Actual Fucking and Kate Bush.  It was released on Automation Records.

Kidwell is said to be working on a newly formed side project by the name of Sandcats as well, described as being "a solo project for two people", his wife and himself. They moved back to Baltimore in 2005.

Kidwell would later work in theater. Kidwell made his acting debut in an adaptation of Philip K. Dick's Ubik in 2012. Kidwell predominantly spent 2013 working in theater productions and DJing at clubs in Baltimore. He performed new music as Cex in 2014 that was described as a "dramatic change in direction".

Discography

Albums
 Cells (1998 · Underscore Records)
 Role Model (2000 · Tigerbeat6)
 Oops, I Did It Again! (2001 · Tigerbeat6)
 Tall, Dark, & Handcuffed (2002 · Tigerbeat6)
 Being Ridden (2003 · Temporary Residence)
 BR Instrumentals (2003 · Temporary Residence)
 Maryland Mansions (2003 · Jade Tree Records)
 Actual Fucking (2006 · Automation Records)
 Sketchi (2007 · Temporary Residence)
  Dannibal  (2007 · Must Finish/Wildfirewildfire Records)
  Bataille Royale  (2009 · Must Finish/Tigerbeat6)
  Konx Om Cex, Vol. 1  (2010 • Must Finish)
  Tiny Creature  (2011 · Tigerbeat6)
  Presumed Dead  (2012 · Automation Records)
  Masokismi  (2012 · Wtr Clr)
  Prosperity  as Rjyan Kidwell (2013 · Nibbana/Tigerbeat6)
  Shamaneater  (2014 · Automation Records)

EPs/Singles/Splits
 Shift-Minus Vol. 1 (1999 · Underscore Records)
 Get Your Badass On EP (2000 · 555 Recordings)
 Role Playa (2000 · Tigerbeat6/555 Recordings)
  Starship Galactica (2001 · 555 Recordings)
  Oops, I Did It Again! EP (2001 · Tigerbeat6)
  $ Vol. 2 (2001 · Tigerbeat6)
  The "Connected" Series#2 (2001 · Klangkrieg)
  Bad Acne EP (2002 · Tigerbeat6)
  Shotgun Wedding Vol. 3: Oh, So Now You Fuckers Wanna Dance? (2004 · Violent Turd)
  Know Doubt (2005 · Record Label)
 Miami Mansions (2006 · Must Finish)
  Exotical Privates (2007 · Automation Records)
  Baltimore Ends with an E split cassette with Mark Brown (2009 • Holy Holy Holy Records)
  Nonconsenshredemption (2010 • Wtr Clr)
  Evargreaz (2010 · Automation Records)
  Megamuse EP (2011 · Tigerbeat6)
  Secret Monog EP (2011 · Tigerbeat6)
  Title King split cassette with Jason Urick (2011 · Wtr Clr)
  Cobweb & Colossus EP (2012 · Tigerbeat6)

References

External links

Cex on Discogs
Interview with Cex (2003)
Mini-Interview with Cex on Aural States (July 2008)
Interview with Cex (2011)

American dance music groups
Intelligent dance musicians
Living people
Year of birth missing (living people)
Temporary Residence Limited artists